Wind in the Face is a 1930 Soviet drama film directed by Iosif Kheifits and Aleksandr Zarkhi.

Plot 
The film tells about a group of Komsomol members who, in the early 1920s, remake the beer hall under the communal hostel. The organizer of the commune Boris together with his wife Nina leads a child and move to the apartment of the parents of the spouse, but they become very uncomfortable there and Boris moves back to the commune. Their city is under threat of flooding. Will the Komsomols save the factory's assets?

Cast 
 Aleksandr Melnikov as Valerian
 Oleg Zhakov as Boris
 Zoya Gleizarova as Nina
 Aleksandr Melnikov

Bibliography
 Irina Graschenkova. https://books.google.com/books?id=KQMSDgAAQBAJ&pg=PT394 Cinema anthropology XX / 20]: Man, 2014.

References

External links 

1930 films
Soviet drama films
1930 drama films
Films directed by Aleksandr Zarkhi
Soviet black-and-white films
Lost Russian films
Films directed by Iosif Kheifits
1930 directorial debut films
1930 lost films
Lost drama films
Lost Soviet films
Russian black-and-white films